Chad Anthony Knaus (born August 5, 1971) is an American former NASCAR crew chief. He is currently employed at Hendrick Motorsports as the Vice President of Competition. Knaus has 81 victories as Jimmie Johnson's crew chief and is the only NASCAR crew chief to win five consecutive championships. He has worked in NASCAR since 1991. Over this time, he has worked for four teams: Dale Earnhardt Incorporated, Melling Racing, Tyler Jet Motorsports and Hendrick Motorsports. He has been a crew chief in NASCAR for 19 years and is considered to be one of the greatest NASCAR crew chiefs of all-time.

Early life
Born in Rockford, Illinois on August 5, 1971. He has 2 half sisters and a half brother. He graduated from Jefferson High School in 1989. Knaus grew up around the racetracks of the Midwest helping his father, John, race against the likes of Mark Martin, Alan Kulwicki, Rusty Wallace, and Dick Trickle. By the time he was 14, Knaus served as crew chief during his father's Rockford Speedway championship season. The father-son combination also won the Great Northern Series championship and finished second in the NASCAR Winston Racing Series. A few years and seven track championships later, Knaus moved to North Carolina in 1991 to pursue a job in national stock car racing.

Racing career
After working with Stanley Smith's stock car team, Knaus joined the No. 24 Hendrick Motorsports team led by crew chief Ray Evernham and raced by driver Jeff Gordon. From 1993 to 1997, Knaus advanced from being a general fabricator to managing the entire chassis and body construction program for the No. 24 team. Serving as a rear tire changer on the original Rainbow Warriors pit crew, Knaus was a part of the 1995 and 1997 championship teams.

Following the 1997 season, Knaus joined Dale Earnhardt, Inc. as car chief, where he worked with the No. 1 team driven by Steve Park and Darrell Waltrip in the 1998 season. After Park returned to the team from his injuries, Knaus and Waltrip moved to Tyler Jet Motorsports. In 1999, Knaus moved to Melling Racing after Evernham, who had just left Hendrick Motorsports, invited him to lead the Dodge development team. During two Dodge test sessions, Knaus worked with driver Stacy Compton. The two worked well together, resulting in Knaus' promotion to crew chief for Compton in October 2000.

Crew chief
In 2001, Compton and Knaus started in the front row for the Daytona 500, took the pole position at the Talladega 500, and qualified third at the Pepsi 400 at Daytona. Despite restrictor plate track qualifying prowess, the team scored just one top 10 (Daytona 500) and five top 15 finishes.

Knaus returned to Hendrick Motorsports for the 2002 season, becoming crew chief of the No. 48 car driven by rookie driver Jimmie Johnson. The team recorded three race wins, six top-five positions, 21 top-ten positions, and four pole positions, two of which were for the Daytona 500 and Aaron's 499. Knaus and Johnson finished the season fifth in the Driver's Championship. In 2003, the No. 48 team finished second in the Driver's Championship after earning two pole positions and winning three races, including the Coca-Cola 600. The team also recorded 14 top-five positions and 20 top ten positions.

In 2004, the season began with some early disappointments in weeks two and three at Rockingham and Las Vegas. However, the team quickly rebounded with a week five win at the Carolina Dodge Dealers 400 at Darlington Raceway. Subsequent victories at the Coca-Cola 600 and the Pocono 500 helped solidify their place in the NASCAR Chase for the Cup towards the end of the season. However, poor finishes at Talladega (37th) and Kansas (32nd) nearly ended their chances to win the Nextel Cup, but three consecutive wins, and four in the final six races, put the No. 48 team 18 points behind leader Kurt Busch going into the final race. The second victory at the Subway 500 in Martinsville on October 24, 2004, was marred by tragedy when Rick Hendrick's son, Ricky, nieces and brother were killed in an airplane crash en route to the race. All eight passengers and both pilots died in the incident. The team eventually finished second in the Cup Series points, losing to Kurt Busch by eight points.

Knaus and Johnson finished the 2005 season ranked fifth in the standings after a crash in the season ending race at Homestead.

In 2006, Johnson and Knaus won their first Cup Series championship with 5 wins, 13 top 5s, and 24 top 10s.

In 2007, Knaus and Johnson took home their second straight championship with a series best 10 wins. Hendrick Motorsports was the dominant team in 2007, amassing 18 wins in 36 races. Knaus and Johnson led the Hendrick charge that saw the championship battle come down to a race between themselves and teammate Jeff Gordon.

In 2008, Knaus and Johnson tied NASCAR history with three straight championships set by Cale Yarborough. The Lowe's Racing team had seven wins, 15 top-fives, 22 top-tens, and six poles.

In 2009, Knaus shared 13 top-fives, 20 top-tens, six wins, and 1 DNF with Johnson.

On October 10, 2018, Hendrick Motorsports announced that Knaus would move to the No. 24 team of William Byron in 2019, ending his 16-year partnership with Johnson after 83 wins and seven NASCAR Cup Championships. Byron posted his first win in 2020 at the Coke Zero Sugar 400 and Knaus's first win since 2017. In September 2020, it was announced Knaus would step down from his crew chief role at Hendrick Motorsports and become the team's vice president of competition.

Rules violations and suspensions
Knaus's first suspension, for two races, came in March 2001 for a seatbelt violation at the Atlanta Motor Speedway. It was notable because it was the first safety violation in the wake of Dale Earnhardt's death. Knaus appealed, but lost, returning at Texas three weeks later.

While working for Hendrick Motorsports, Knaus was accused of cheating after Jimmie Johnson's 2006 Daytona 500 qualifying run. He had made an illegal adjustment to the rear window, which resulted in his suspension from  Cup Series events until March 22. Despite the loss of his crew chief (and having to start from the rear of the field in a backup car), Johnson won both the Daytona 500 and two of the first three races overall with interim crew chief Darian Grubb.

Knaus again found himself at the center of controversy during the road race debut of NASCAR's Car of Tomorrow. On June 23, 2007, the #24 crew (chiefed by Steve Letarte) and the #48 crew entered the inspection line for the Toyota/Save Mart 350 at Infineon Raceway with the newest body style out of the Hendrick shop. While both cars fit the templates, NASCAR officials questioned the shape of the fenders in between the template points. Johnson was not allowed to qualify the car and started at the back of the field. Knaus was fined $100,000 and was suspended for six races.

In February 2012, Knaus was once again accused by NASCAR officials of a rules violation involving the #48 car of Jimmie Johnson after it failed pre-race inspection for the Daytona 500. NASCAR issued penalties: Knaus and #48 car chief Ron Malec were suspended six races each, Knaus was fined $100,000, and driver Jimmie Johnson docked 25 driver points. On March 20, 2012, the chief appellate officer of NASCAR rescinded the suspensions and the docked driver points but left the financial penalty in place.

Outside activities
Knaus was a regular commentator on NASCAR Performance, a program that was broadcast each race weekend on Speed. Each program provided a crew chief perspective on stock car racing. Knaus has also appeared in several television commercials for Kobalt Tools by Lowe's, the primary sponsor of the No. 48 car at the time. He also voices the crew chief in NASCAR games which include NASCAR 08 and NASCAR 09 on the Xbox 360 and PlayStation 3.

Personal life
Knaus married Brooke Werner (the former Miss Vermont USA in 2009) in August 2015. They have two children.

Crew chief statistics

Cup Series

† - Suspended by NASCAR for multiple races.
‡ - Car was victorious two other times, but Knaus was suspended at the time.
# - Knaus missed one race due to the birth of his daughter.

Xfinity Series

† - Knaus served as crew chief for Justin Allgaier for the 2017 Ford EcoBoost 300 Xfinity Series championship race as a result of a suspension to Jason Burdett at Phoenix because of a brake infraction.

References

External links
 
 Team Lowe's Racing
 Hendrick Motorsports
 NASCAR Performance

1971 births
Living people
NASCAR crew chiefs
Sportspeople from Rockford, Illinois